Friedrich Wilhelm Eduard Keutgen (28 July 1861 – 30 September 1936) was a German historian and professor of history at the University of Hamburg, after his first professorial appointment as professor of medieval and modern history at the University of Jena. He was born at Bremen and studied at Giessen, Göttingen, and Strassburg. He wrote:  
 Die Hansa und England im Vierzehnten Jahrhundert (1890)
 Untersuchungen über den Ursprung der deutschen Stadtverfassung (1895)
 Die Aufgabe der Genealogie (1899)
 Urkunden zur städtischen Verfassungsgeschichte (1901)
 Der Grosshandel im Mittelalter (1902)
 Ämter und Zünfte (1903)
 Handelsgeschichtliche Probleme (1904)
 Britische Reichsprobleme und der Krieg (1914)
 Entstehung des Britischen Weltreichs (1915)
 Das Britische Kolonialreich (1916)
 Der Deutsche Staat des Mittelalters (1918)

External links
 
 

Academic staff of the University of Hamburg
Writers from Hamburg
20th-century German historians
1861 births
1936 deaths
German male non-fiction writers
19th-century German historians